The Transit Research and Attitude Control (TRAAC) satellite was launched by the U. S. Navy from Cape Canaveral along with Transit 4B on November 15, 1961.

Mission 
The 109 kg satellite was used to test the feasibility of using gravity-gradient stabilization in Transit navigational satellites. It provided information on the effects of radiation from nuclear explosions in space, as it was one of several satellites whose detectors provided data for the Starfish Prime test; ultimately its solar cells were damaged by the radiation and it ceased operation. It was among several satellites which were inadvertently damaged or destroyed by the Starfish Prime high-altitude nuclear test on July 9, 1962 and subsequent radiation belt.

Poem 
The first poem to be launched into orbit about the Earth was inscribed on the instrument panel of TRAAC. Entitled Space Prober and written by Prof. Thomas G. Bergin of Yale University, it reads in part:
And now 'tis man who dares assault the sky...
And as we come to claim our promised place, aim only to repay the good you gave,
And warm with human love the chill of space.

References

Satellites orbiting Earth
Spacecraft launched in 1961